José Salomón (9 July 1916 in La Plata – 22 January 1990) was an Argentine football defender who played club football for Talleres de Remedios de Escalada and Racing Club de Avellaneda and captained the Argentina national football team.

Salomón started his career in 1934 with Talleres before moving to Avellaneda to play for Racing Club between 1939 and 1945.

Salomón played a total of 44 games for Argentina including 21 in the Copa América a national record he shares with Oscar Ruggeri. Salomón was part of two Copa América winning teams but his career was ended in the 1946 edition of the competition by a Jair Rosa Pinto tackle which broke his tibia and fibula sparking a riot and pitch invasion and fueling the Argentina and Brazil football rivalry.

Honours

References

External links

1916 births
1990 deaths
Footballers from La Plata
Argentine footballers
Association football defenders
Talleres de Remedios de Escalada footballers
Racing Club de Avellaneda footballers
Liverpool F.C. (Montevideo) players
Expatriate footballers in Uruguay
Argentina international footballers